Epoca d'Oro, (Japanese: エポカドーロ, foaled 15 February 2015) is a Japanese Thoroughbred racehorse. After finishing third on his only appearance as a two-year-old in 2017 he showed steady improvement in the following spring, winning two minor races and finishing second in the Spring Stakes before recording his biggest success in the Satsuki Sho. He went on to finish runner-up in the Tokyo Yushun but failed to reproduce his best form in two subsequent starts that year.

Background
Epoca d'Oro is a bay colt bred in Japan by Toru Tagami. As a foal in 2015 he was consigned to the Select Sale and was bought for ¥36,720,000 by the Union Owner's Club. The colt was sent into training with Hideaki Fujiwara. He was ridden in most of his races by Keita Kosaki.

He was from the first crop of foals sired by Orfevre, who was the Japanese Horse of the Year in 2011 and whose wins included the Satsuki Sho, Tokyo Yushun, Kikuka Sho, Arima Kinen and Takarazuka Kinen. Orfevre's other progeny include Lucky Lilac. Epoca d'Oro's dam Daiwa Passion was a top-class performer whose wins included the Fairy Stakes and the Fillies' Revue. She was a great-granddaughter of the outstanding Irish mare Cairn Rouge whose other descendants have included Persuasive.

Racing career

2017: two-year-old season
Epoca d'Oro made his first and only appearance as a two-year-old in a contest for previously unraced juveniles over 1800 metres at Kyoto Racecourse on 9 October. Racing on firm turf he finished third of the ten runners behind Tanglewood and Satono Eternal.

2018: three-year-old season

On his three-year-old debut Epoca d'Oro recorded his first victory when he defeated Rano Kau and fourteen others in a maiden race over 1600 metres at Kyoto on 21 January. Three weeks later he was stepped up in distance and followed up successfully in the Asunaro Sho over 2000 metres at Kokura Racecourse. In the following month he was moved up in class for the Grade 2 Spring Stakes (a trial race for the Satsuki Sho) over 1800 metres at Nakayama Racecourse and was made the 4.3/1 third choice in a field of thirteen runners. Ridden by Tosaki he settled in second place before taking the lead in the straight but was caught on the line and beaten a nose by the favourite Stelvio. 

On 15 April at the same track Epoca d'Oro, with Tosaki again in the saddle, started at odds of 13.5/1 for the 78th edition of the Satsuki Sho over 2000 metres. Wagnerian started favourite ahead of Stelvio with the other thirteen runners including Kitano Commandeur (Sumire Stakes), Time Flyer (Hopeful Stakes, Gendarme (Daily Hai Nisai Stakes), Oken Moon (Tokinominoru Kinen) and Generale Uno (Keisei Stakes). Aithon set a strong pace from Jun Valerot and Generale Uno with the trio pulling many lengths clear of the others who were headed by Epoca d'Oro. The leaders began to tire approaching the final turn and Epoca d'Oro gained the advantage from Generale Uno in the last 200 metres before drawing away to win by two lengths from Sans Rival. Tosaki commented "I was able to position him as planned. He ran in good rhythm and responded well rounding the final corner. He's a smart horse and is developing with each race. His powerful run today shows that he will have no problem handling the extra distance in the Tokyo Yushun".

At Tokyo Racecourse on 27 May Epoca d'Oro was made the 8.5/1 fourth choice behind Danon Premium, Blast Onepiece and Kitano Commandeur in the 85th running of the Tokyo Yushun over 2400 metres. He took the lead soon after the start, led the field into the straight and repelled several challengers before being caught in the final strides by Wagnerian and beaten half a length into second place.

After a break of almost four months the colt returned for the Kobe Shimbun Hai at Hanshin Racecourse in September and started joint-favourite with Wagnerian. After stumbling as he exited the starting gate he raced towards the rear of the field before staying on in the straight and came home fourth of the ten runners. On his final start of the season Epoca d'Oro started third favourite for the Kikuka Sho over 3000 metres. He was in contention for most of the way but faded in the closing stages to finish eighth behind Fierement, beaten five lengths by the winner.

In the 2018 World's Best Racehorse Rankings Epoca d'Oro was rated the 15th best three-year-old colt in the world and the 78th best horse of any age or sex. In January 2019 Epoca d'Oro finished fourth behind Blast Onepiece, Wagnerian and the dirt champion Le Vent Se Leve in the poll to determine the JRA Award for Best Three-Year-Old Colt for 2018 .

2019: four-year-old season
Epoca d'Oro began his third campaign in the Grade 2 Nakayama Kinen on 24 February and came home fifth of the eleven starters behind Win Bright, Lucky Lilac, Stelvio and Suave Richard, beaten two lengths by the winner. In the Grade 1 Osaka Hai the horse started a 13.3/1 outsider in a fourteen-runner field. He set the pace and maintained his advantage into the straight but dropped away quickly in the closing stages and finished tenth behind Al Ain. Epoca d'Oro did not race again in 2019.

Pedigree

References 

2015 racehorse births
Racehorses bred in Japan
Racehorses trained in Japan
Thoroughbred family 1-l